Moomba Airport  is located in the gazetted locality of Gidgealpa, South Australia.

Airlines and destinations

See also
 List of airports in South Australia

References

Airports in South Australia
Far North (South Australia)